Best Video from a Film (最優秀映画ビデオ賞)

Results
The following table displays the nominees and the winners in bold print with a yellow background.

2000s

2010s

See also
MTV Video Music Award for Best Video from a Film

Awards established in 2002
2002 establishments in Japan